Clark William Trisler (November 8, 1840 – February 26, 1821) was an American farmer and politician.

Trisler was born in Ohio and to the local public schools. In 1868, he moved with his wife and family to Whitewater Falls, Winona County, Minnesota. Trisler was a farmer. He served in the Minnesota House of Representatives in 1873 and was a Republican.

References

1840 births
1921 deaths
People from Ohio
People from Winona County, Minnesota
Farmers from Minnesota
Republican Party members of the Minnesota House of Representatives